180th Brigade may refer to any of a number of  military divisions:
 180th Mixed Brigade (Spain)
 180th (2/5th London) Brigade (United Kingdom)